Class A may refer to:

Communications technology
 Class-A amplifier, a category of electronic amplifier
 Class A network, in Internet technology, a type of large network
 Class A television service, a system for regulating low power stations in the United States

Sports
 Class A (baseball), a level of American Minor League Baseball
 Class A (classification), a Paralympic wheelchair fencing classification

Transportation
 Class A airfield, a type of World War II British military installation
 Class A surface, in automotive design
 Milwaukee Road class A, a class of steam locomotives
 Norfolk and Western Railway class A, a class of steam locomotives
 Class A, a type of commercial driver's license in the United States
 Class A, an ICAO airspace class
 Class A, a type of motorhome

Other uses
 Class A (novel), a 2004 CHERUB novel by Robert Muchamore
 Class A drug, a classification of drugs controlled by the UK Misuse of Drugs Act
 Class A office space, a Building Owners and Managers Association category
 Library of Congress Classification:Class A -- General Works
 Class A, a stellar classification
 Class A, a retired type of United States Army Service Uniform
 Class A foams, a type of foam used in firefighting

See also 
 A class (disambiguation)
 Class B (disambiguation)